The Central Ozarks Conference is a high school athletic conference represented by 10 schools in the southwest portion of Missouri.  All schools are in the Ozarks region of the state.  The Central Ozark Conference offers championships for girls in Basketball, Cross Country, Golf, Soccer, Softball, Swimming & Diving, Tennis, Track & Field, Volleyball, and Wrestling.   The Central Ozark Conference offers championships for boys Baseball, Basketball, Cross Country, Football, Golf, Soccer, Swimming & Diving, Tennis, Track & Field, and Wrestling.

List of member schools

Membership History
Carl Junction joined the Central Ozark Conference in July 2016 after three decades in the Big 8 Conference (Missouri).

Joplin High School joined the Central Ozarks Conference in July 2018.  Joplin moved from the Ozark Conference.

The Central Ozark Conference Small division disbanded after the 2017-18 school year. The remaining schools, with the exception of Bolivar High School, will join the Big 8 Conference (Missouri). Bolivar submitted an application to join the Ozark Conference in late December, but was rejected. They went independent for three seasons and was then admitted into the Ozark Conference in July 2021 on a second attempt to join, replacing Central High School(Springfield), who went independent.

References

High school sports conferences and leagues in the United States
Missouri high school athletic conferences